Founded in 1903, the Middle States Council for the Social Studies (MSCSS) is the oldest professional organization in the country devoted solely to social studies education. MSCSS engages and supports educators in strengthening and advocating social studies as a core discipline. With members across the country, MSCSS serves as an umbrella organization for elementary, secondary, college and university professionals, who are involved with all social studies disciplines. The mission of MSCSS is to provide leadership, service, and support for social studies educators of all levels.

Members include: Delaware, Maryland, New Jersey, New York, Pennsylvania, and Washington, D.C.

Social studies educators teach students the content, knowledge, intellectual skills, and civic values necessary for fulfilling the duties of active and participatory citizenship. MSCSS uses grants and awards to recognize and encourage professionalism and leadership among educators engaged in social studies education. Social studies educators play a critical role as citizens in their respective communities, states, country and the world.

MSCSS serves as a clearinghouse of ideas, materials and trends in social studies. Publications and an annual conferences provide vehicles for communicating and connecting with the National Council for the Social Studies (NCSS) and with state and local social studies councils within the region, its own members, and other professional organizations.

References

External links
http://www.midstatescouncil.org/
https://www.facebook.com/MiddleStatesCouncilforSocialStudies Middle States Council for the Social Studies website
http://www.socialstudies.org/

Professional associations based in the United States